Erigeron klamathensis is a North American species of flowering plant in the family Asteraceae known by the common name Klamath fleabane or Klamath daisy. It had been collected by botanists for many years and generally regarded as part of E. foliosus. It was not recognized as a distinct species until 2004.

Erigeron klamathensis is native to the Klamath Ranges of southwestern Oregon and northwestern California. It is a perennial herb up to 20 cm (8 inches) tall, producing a woody taproot. The stem is covered with stiff, straight hairs, unlike some related species. Leaves are most on the stem rather than crowded close to the ground. Each stem can produce 1-5 flower heads, each with as many as 30 purple or lavender ray florets surrounding numerous yellow disc florets.

References

External links
Photo of herbarium specimen at Missouri Botanical Garden, collected on Trinity Summit in California in 1937, isotype of Erigeron klamathensis

klamathensis
Flora of California
Flora of Oregon
Plants described in 1992
Flora without expected TNC conservation status